The Kimberley lined ctenotus (Ctenotus rhabdotus)  is a species of skink found in Northern Territory and Western Australia.

References

rhabdotus
Reptiles described in 2017
Taxa named by Daniel L. Rabosky
Taxa named by Paul Doughty